The Camuni or Camunni were an ancient population located in Val Camonica during the Iron Age (1st millennium BC); the Latin name Camunni was attributed to them by the authors of the 1st century. They are also called ancient Camuni, to distinguish them from the current inhabitants of the valley (the Camuni or Camunians). The Camunni were among the greatest producers of rock art in Europe; their name is linked to the famous rock engravings of Valcamonica.

A people of obscure origin, they lived in a region, the Val Camonica, that had already been the site of a cultural tradition dating back to the early Neolithic. The Camunni are mentioned by classical historiographical sources from the 1st century BC, corresponding to the Iron Age in Val Camonica (from the 12th century BC until about Romanization).

Conquered by Rome at the beginning of the 1st century AD, the Camunni were gradually incorporated into the political and social structures of the Roman Empire as a self-governing polity called the Res Publica Camunnorum. They were granted Roman citizenship from the second half of the 1st century, with a rapid process of Latinization.

History

The Camunni in classical sources
The Greek historian Strabo (63/64 BC–ca. 24 AD) described the Camunni as part of the Rhaetian peoples and related to the Lepontii (who according to Strabo were of Rhaetic stock, though modern linguists generally regard the Lepontic language as Celtic):

The Roman historian Pliny the Elder (23–79 AD), citing the Origines of Cato the Elder (234–149 BC), spoke instead of the Camunni as one of several tribes of the Euganei:

Contacts with the Etruscans and Celts
The Etruscans, already widespread in the Po Valley, had contacts with Alpine populations by the 5th century BC. Surviving traces of Etruscan cultural influence are recorded in the aforementioned rock art in over two hundred texts written in the Camunic alphabet, which is a variant of the North Etruscan alphabet. At the beginning of the 4th century BC, the Celtic Gauls arrived in Italy. Coming from Transalpine Gaul, they settled in the Po plain and came in touch with the Camunian population. Some of the petroglyphs in Valcamonica with figures of Celtic deities such as Kernunnos attest this Gaulish presence.

The Roman conquest

Val Camonica was subjected to Rome during the campaigns of Augustus to conquer Raetia and the Alpine arc, conducted by his generals Nero Claudius Drusus and Tiberius (the future emperor) against the mountain peoples in 16–15 BC. Publius Silius Nerva, governor of Illyricum, was to complete the conquest of the eastern Alpine front, which reached from the valley of Como to Lake Garda (therefore including the Valcamonica), in addition to the Vennoneti of Vinschgau.

The Roman conquest is also mentioned by the Roman historian Cassius Dio writing in Greek:

The Camunni and Vennoni, Alpine tribes, took up arms against the Romans, but were conquered and subdued by Publius Silius.

This conquest was celebrated in the Trophy of the Alps (Tropaeum Alpium), a Roman monument erected in 7–6 BC and located in the French town of La Turbie, whose frontal inscription named the conquered Alpine peoples:

After the Roman conquest, the Camunni were annexed to the nearest cities in a condition of semi-subjection through the practice of adtributio, which allowed them to maintain their own tribal constitution while the dominant city became the administrative, judicial, and fiscal center. The city that the Camunni were assigned to was probably Brixia. At first they were assigned the status of peregrinus, and then they obtained Roman citizenship; in the Flavian Age they were assigned to the Quirina tribe, while they maintained a certain self-government; in fact, a Res Publica Camunnorum has been recorded.

Romanization proceeded from Civitas Camunnorum (Cividate Camuno), a city founded by the Romans around 23 BC, during the principate of Tiberius. Beginning in the 1st century, the Camunni were included in stable Roman political and social structures, as evidenced by the numerous legionaries, artisans, and even gladiators of Camunian origins in several areas of the Roman Empire. Camunian religion went through the process of interpretatio Romana, forming a syncretic combination with Roman religion.

Religion
Camunian stone carvings, 70–80% of which date to the Bronze Age, are thought to have held value for celebratory, commemorative, initiatory, and propitiatory rituals. The Sanctuary of Minerva, found at Spinera between Cividate Camuno and Breno in 1986, dates to the Roman period and was finely decorated with mosaics.

The beginning of the Middle Ages coincided with the arrival of the Christian religion among the Camunni. The 4th and 5th centuries witnessed the destruction of the ancient places of worship, with the destruction of statue menhirs in Ossimo and Cemmo and the burning of the Sanctuary of Minerva.

Language

Surviving traces of the language spoken by the Camunni are scarce and undeciphered. Among the Rock Drawings in Valcamonica there are some inscriptions written in the Camunic language, written in a northern variant of the Etruscan alphabet. There is insufficient knowledge about Camunic to be able to determine whether it belongs to a broader language family.

References

Bibliography

Primary sources
 Cassius Dio, Roman History
 Pliny the Elder, Naturalis Historia
 Strabo, Geographica
 Trophy of the Alps

Historiographical literature 
 Raffaele De Marinis, Le popolazioni alpine di stirpe retica in G. Pugliese Carratelli (a cura di) Italia omnium terrarum alumna, Milano, Garzanti-Scheiwiller, 1988. pp. 95–155
 Lino Ertani, La Valle Camonica attraverso la storia, Esine, Tipolitografia Valgrigna, 1996.
 Francesco Fedele, L'uomo, le Alpi, la Valcamonica - 20.000 anni di storia al Castello di Breno, Boario Terme, La Cittadina, 1988.
 Valeria Mariotti, Il teatro e l'anfiteatro di Cividate Camuno, Arti grafiche BMB, 2004. 
 Pietro Paolo Ormanico, Considerationi sopra alcvne memorie della Religione Antica dei Camvli, ò Camvni, Bornato, Sardini Editrice [1639], 1983.
 Umberto Sansoni, Silvana Gavaldo, L'arte rupestre del Pià d'Ort: la vicenda di un santuario preistorico alpino, Edizioni del Centro, 1995.
 Ronald Syme, "The Alps" in Cambridge Ancient History, Cambridge, Cambridge University Press, Vol. VIII.

See also
Ancient peoples of Italy
Rock Drawings in Valcamonica
Val Camonica

Ancient peoples of Italy
Tribes conquered by Rome